Anne Parr may refer to:

Anne Bourchier, 7th Baroness Bourchier, married name Anne Parr, wife of William Parr, 1st Marquess of Northampton
Anne Parr, Lady Herbert, sister and lady-in-waiting to Katherine Parr, sixth wife of Henry VIII of England and sister-in-law of the above